Maria Emilia Castagliola (born 1946) is a Cuban-American painter and a conceptual artist. Born in Havana, Cuba, she immigrated to the United States in 1961. Her early work stressed her Cuban roots with the use of Catholic and Renaissance icons; her more recent projects have been installation and community-based.

Biography
Castagliola has a B.A. degree in sociology plus B.F.A and M.F.A degrees from the University of South Florida and has taught art, as an assistant professor, at the same university. Castagliola now lives in St. Petersburg, Florida where she is a practicing artist.

Castagliola came to art after a background in social services and religion. She is now considered one of the most thoughtful and respected Bay area artists. Her early work synthesized her Cuban roots with Catholic and Renaissance icons, but she also tried to incorporate personal things in her artwork. She then moved on towards installation and community-based projects. Castagliola discusses that it is within her work that we can see and comprehend her bicultural dichotomy. She focuses her artwork on Latin American traditions and incorporates Spanish and religious icons that were present or significant in her childhood. Maria Emilia Castagliola considers herself to be an "outsider" even though she works in the mainstream.

Artworks

A Matter of Trust (1994) 
A Matter of Trust is an artwork that was created by Castagliola in 1994. She arranged ordinary paper envelopes in quilt patterns of triangles, rectangles, and squares in order to create an artwork that represented intimacy and trust. Castagliolas's friends and family members provided her with their deepest personal secrets , and she then sewed them shut inside the envelope. She felt that it allowed others to share everything and trust that there would be support and understanding. She started this piece with the intention of never opening the envelopes which contained the secrets inside. In order to do this, she sealed the quilt between sheets of fiberglass window screen.

Senos de duro ensano ("Bodice of the Moon") 
Castagliola collaborated with Lorca by using the poets words and titles as "verbal launch pads"  One of her works "Senos de duro ensano" represented the idea of moon and death. She incorporated symbols from Lorca's writing as well. Once she finished the piece, she realized that it represented her own psychological state of mind.

Exhibitions 
Tampa Museum of Art, Florida, solo exhibition. (1993)

Collections 
Smithsonian American Art Museum, "A Matter of Trust" (1994) and " The Birthing Album (1994).

Bibliography 
 Puerto, Cecilia. Kahlo and look who else; a selective bibliography on twentieth-century Latin American artists. (1996)
 O'Reilly, Andrea. Remembering Cuba: A Legacy of Diaspora. University of Texas Press. (2001)

Publications 
"Maria Emilia Castagliola: In Praise of Federico Garcia Lorca". The authors of this book are Maria Emilia Castagliola and Jose Martinez-Canas. The publisher was the Gulf Coast Museum of Art in 2001.

References 

1949 births
Living people
20th-century Cuban women artists
21st-century Cuban women artists
Artists from Havana
Cuban emigrants to the United States
University of South Florida alumni
University of South Florida faculty